Gram Parsons Archives Vol.1: Live at the Avalon Ballroom 1969 is a twenty-seven song, two-disc set released November 6, 2007, by Amoeba Records, taken from two shows at the Avalon Ballroom in San Francisco when the Flying Burrito Brothers opened for the Grateful Dead. The album features live versions of several songs never officially released by the band, such as "She Once Lived Here".

Amoeba Records co-founder Dave Prinz found tapes of the two shows among the 16,000 hours of material in the Grateful Dead's vault, and after considerable lobbying, convinced Grateful Dead sound engineer Owsley Stanley, who oversaw the Dead's material, to license the Burritos’ material to Amoeba's record label. It was regarded as a "coup" because Stanley, a.k.a. the Bear, hadn't licensed anything from his personal vault since 1970.

Grateful Dead keyboardist Tom Constanten sits in on three tracks.

Disc 1 (recorded April 4, 1969) 
"Close Up the Honky Tonks" (Red Simpson) – 2:38
"Dark End of the Street" (Chips Moman, Dan Penn) – 3:57
Medley: "Undo the Right"/"Somebody's Back in Town" (Willie Nelson, Hank Cochran) (Don Helms, Theodore Wilburn, Doyle Wilburn) – 3:16
"She Once Lived Here" (Autry Inman) – 3:54
"We've Got to Get Ourselves Together" (Bonnie Bramlett, Delaney Bramlett, Carl Radle) – 3:31
"Lucille" (Richard Penniman, Al Collins) – 2:38
"Hot Burrito #1" (Chris Ethridge, Gram Parsons) – 3:40
"Hot Burrito #2" (Ethridge, Parsons) – 4:05
"Long Black Limousine" (Vern Stovall) – 3:38
"Mental Revenge" (Mel Tillis) – 3:07
"Sin City" (Parsons, Hillman) – 4:02
Bonus tracks:
"Thousand Dollar Wedding" (Parsons) – 4:24
"When Will I Be Loved" (Phil Everly) – 2:16

Disc 1 ends with two previously unreleased home recordings recorded by Jimmi Seiter:  “Thousand Dollar Wedding" recorded in Los Angeles in 1969, and "When Will I Be Loved" recorded in New York City in 1967.

Disc 2 (recorded April 6, 1969) 
Medley: "Undo the Right"/"Somebody's Back in Town" (Willie Nelson/Hank Cochran) (Helms/T Wilburn/D Wilburn) – 3:16
"She Once Lived Here" (Inman) – 4:06
"Mental Revenge" (Mel Tillis) – 3:13
"We've Got to Get Ourselves Together" (Bonnie Bramlett/Delaney Bramlett/Carl Radle) – 3:43
"Lucille" (Penniman/Collins) – 2:39
"Sin City" (Parsons/Chris Hillman) – 4:08
"You Win Again" (Hank Williams) – 3:06
"Hot Burrito #1" (Ethridge/Parsons) – 3:53
"Hot Burrito #2" (Ethridge/Parsons) – 4:00
"You're Still on My Mind" (Luke McDaniel) – 2:34
"Train Song" (Parsons/Hillman) – 3:43
"Long Black Limousine" (Stovall) – 3:15
"Dream Baby (How Long Must I Dream)" (Cindy Walker) – 3:18
"Do Right Woman" (Chips Moman/Dan Penn) - 5:01

Personnel 
Gram Parsons – lead vocals, guitar, piano
Chris Hillman – guitar, backing vocals
Sneaky Pete Kleinow – pedal steel guitar
Chris Ethridge – bass guitar
Michael Clarke – drums
guest:
Tom Constanten - organ on "Hot Burrito #1" (both discs) and "Hot Burrito #2" (disc 2 only)

Chart performance

References 

The Flying Burrito Brothers albums
2007 live albums